Shiloh, Texas may refer to:

Shiloh, Gregg County, Texas, an unincorporated community
Shiloh, Houston County, Texas, a ghost town
Shiloh, Waller County, Texas, an unincorporated settlement

See also
Shiloh (disambiguation)